Kenneth Claude Arthur Reynolds (20 February 1909 – 18 March 1987) was an Australian rules footballer who played with South Melbourne in the Victorian Football League (VFL).

Reynolds enlisted to serve in the Australian Army in June 1940 and was posted to Singapore in early 1941. In 1942 he was captured by the Japanese and was interned in the Changi Prison until his release in 1945.

Notes

External links 

1909 births
1987 deaths
Australian rules footballers from Melbourne
Sydney Swans players
Australian Army personnel of World War II
Australian prisoners of war
World War II prisoners of war held by Japan
People from Richmond, Victoria
Military personnel from Melbourne